Nimberga  is a village in the southern state of Karnataka, India. It is located in the Aland taluk of kalaburagi district. The near by villages are Dhangapur, Battarga, Bommanahalli, Hittalashiroor&Vaijapur

Demographics
 India census, Nimberga had a population of 6345 with 3247 males and 3098 females.

See also
 Gulbarga
 Districts of Karnataka

References

External links
 http://Gulbarga.nic.in/

Villages in Kalaburagi district